Edin Mujković (born 30 April 1995) is a Serbian football midfielder who plays for FK Slavoj Trebišov.
Mujkovic Edin, born April 30, 1995. in Novi Pazar, started playing football at the age of 8. He plays as a midfielder. His career started at the Football Academy „AS“, where he performed 4 times under the Western Srbija selections, and with his team achieved noticeable results on tournaments across the country, becoming champions of Balkan under the age of 16.
Edin had been scouted by a sponsor and the owner of VOSTOK PROM Group, Dr Arquer, which landed a monthly residence in a Spanish club Atletico Madrid’s camp, as well as in the Slovenian Domžale.
His generation has marked best results in the history of the youth branch of FK Novi Pazar, in which they scored 26 victories, 2 ties and 2 defeats and scored a place in the Jelen Super League for up to 19 years olds, rivaling against peers from Partizan, Red Star, Vojvodina and others. As a captain of the team, Mujkovic, along with his teammates, is the only generation in history of youth players who could hold up to a year in the JSL. From the age of 16 to 19 years old, he played for an A team of Novi Pazar, which competes multiple years in a row in the Jelen Super League of Serbia, where Edin made his debut.
With the help of a former player of Vicenza, now manager Almir Gegic, a professional degree contract was tied with the Albanian super-leaguers KF Vllaznia. Last half-season he spent in the Slovak Slavoj Trebišov (2nd league), where he performed in 45 matches and scored 4 goals. 
More information about him on web : www.edinmujkovic.com

References

External links
 
 Edin Mujković stats at utakmica.rs

1995 births
Living people
Sportspeople from Novi Pazar
Association football midfielders
Serbian footballers
FK Novi Pazar players
Serbian SuperLiga players